In Christian theology, Divine apathy is the doctrine that the divine nature is incapable of suffering, passivity or modification.

Religious belief and doctrine
Christian philosophy